The 2021 Tallahassee Tennis Challenger was a professional tennis tournament played on green clay courts. It was the 21st edition of the tournament which was part of the 2021 ATP Challenger Tour. It took place in Tallahassee, Florida, United States between 19 and 25 April 2021.

Singles main-draw entrants

Seeds

 1 Rankings as of April 12, 2021.

Other entrants
The following players received wildcards into the singles main draw:
  Martin Damm
  Ryan Harrison
  Toby Kodat

The following players received entry into the singles main draw as alternates:
  Thomaz Bellucci
  Pedro Sakamoto

The following players received entry from the qualifying draw:
  Filip Jianu
  Alexander Ritschard
  Alex Rybakov
  Agustín Velotti

The following player received entry as a lucky loser:
  Donald Young

Champions

Singles

 Jenson Brooksby def.  Bjorn Fratangelo 6–3, 4–6, 6–3.

Doubles

  Orlando Luz /  Rafael Matos def.  Sekou Bangoura /  Donald Young 7–6(7–2), 6–2.

References

2021 ATP Challenger Tour
2021
2021 in American tennis
2021 in sports in Florida
April 2021 sports events in the United States